The Radio, Electrical and Television Retailers' Association is the main trade association for independent electronic (including television and audio) retailers in the United Kingdom. It was formed in 1942.

Structure
It is situated in the unitary authority of Bedford, off Ampthill Road (A6), near Bedford St Johns railway station. It is the UK's largest trade association for electrical and electronic retailers.

It holds an annual conference in April each year, which first began in 1961.

Purpose
A register of accredited members (retailers) is available on the website. This is a useful resource to find nearby reputable suppliers, especially in a recent years with the digital switchover – potentially lucrative for television retailers, with much (analogue) equipment becoming obsolete.

Because most terminology regarding electrical and electronic equipment is beyond the average consumer, purchasers can be easily misled by confusing sales talk, or prefer not to ask 'dumb' questions. Retailers may take advantage of this situation, and RETRA seeks to prevent any unethical sales practices that pull the wool over consumers' eyes, by including a code of practice that retailers belonging to RETRA must follow, which seeks to protect the consumer. The Office of Fair Trading (quango) seeks to cover consumers generally, but simply does not have the time or manpower to identify problems in every avenue of retailing. RETRA provides the in-depth knowledge that the OFT could never have.

See also
 Communications Select Committee

References

External links
 RETRA
 Industry website
 UK Whitegoods
 Independent Electrical Retailer trade magazine

News items
 Energy rating labels in March 2007

Video clips
 RETRA conference 2010

Organisations based in Bedford
Organizations established in 1942
Trade associations based in the United Kingdom
Consumer electronics retailers of the United Kingdom
Television organisations in the United Kingdom
Radio organisations in the United Kingdom
1942 establishments in the United Kingdom